IAMA may refer to:
 Iama Island, Queensland, an island and a locality in the Torres Strait Island Region, Australia
 Igreja Anglicana de Moçambique e Angola, a proposed new autonomous province of the Anglican Communion, currently in formation
 International Academy of Medical Acupuncture
 Iranian American Medical Association
 r/IAmA, a Reddit community for question-and-answer interactive interviews